The 1979 ATP Buenos Aires was a men's Grand Prix tennis circuit tournament held in Buenos Aires, Argentina that was played on outdoor clay courts. It was the 13th edition of the tournament and was held from 19 November through 25 November 1979. Guillermo Vilas won the singles title.

Finals

Singles

 Guillermo Vilas defeated  José Luis Clerc 6–1, 6–2, 6–2 
 It was Vilas's 5th title of the year and the 61st of his career.

Doubles
 Tomáš Šmíd /  Sherwood Stewart defeated  Marcos Hocevar /  João Soares 6–1, 7–5 
 It was Smid's 4th title of the year and the 7th of his career. It was Stewart's 10th title of the year and the 30th of his career.

References

External links 
 ITF tournament edition details
 ATP tournament profile

ATP Buenos Aires
South American Open (Tennis), 1979
ATP Buenos Aires
South American Open
November 1979 sports events in South America